Carex donnell-smithii is a tussock-forming species of perennial sedge in the family Cyperaceae. It is native to parts of Mexico and Central America.

Description

Taxonomy
The species was first described by the botanist Liberty Hyde Bailey in 1889 as a part of Memoirs of the Torrey Botanical Club. The type specimen was collected in the Alta Verapaz are of Guatemala. 
It has two synonyms;
 Carex jovis described by Charles Baron Clarke in 1908
 Carex pittieri Johann Otto Boeckeler in 1896.

Distribution
It is found in seasonally dry tropical biome from southern Mexico in the north down through much of Central America to Panama in the south.

See also
List of Carex species

References

donnell-smithii
Taxa named by Liberty Hyde Bailey
Plants described in 1889
Flora of Mexico
Flora of Costa Rica
Flora of Guatemala
Flora of Honduras
Flora of Nicaragua
Flora of Panama